Karl Hannemann (4 March 1895 – 13 November 1953) was a German film actor.

Born in Freiberg, Saxony, Germany, he died at the age of 55 in Berlin.

Selected filmography
 The Graveyard of the Living (1921)
 And Yet Luck Came (1923)
 Under the Lantern (1928)
 The Man with the Frog (1929)
 The Street Song (1931)
 No Money Needed (1932)
 Five from the Jazz Band (1932)
 Dreaming Lips (1932)
 Under False Flag (1932)
 Three Bluejackets and a Blonde (1933)
 Hitlerjunge Quex (1933)
 Love, Death and the Devil (1934)
 The Island (1934)
 The Higher Command (1935)
 The Night With the Emperor (1936)
 The Impossible Woman (1936)
 Augustus the Strong (1936)
 The Hour of Temptation (1936)
 The Impossible Woman (1936)
 The Yellow Flag (1937)
 Togger (1937)
 Patriots (1937)
 Dangerous Game (1937)
 Capriccio (1938)
The Secret Lie (1938)
 Freight from Baltimore (1938)
 You and I (1938)
 Steputat & Co. (1938)
 Robert Koch (1939)
 The Life and Loves of Tschaikovsky (1939)
 Nanette (1940)
 Our Miss Doctor (1940)
 The Three Codonas (1940)
 The Fox of Glenarvon (1940)
 The Girl at the Reception (1940)
 The Lucky Seven (1940)
 We Make Music (1942)
 Andreas Schlüter (1942)
 Diesel (1942)
 Much Ado About Nixi (1942)
 Summer Nights (1944)
 The Woman of My Dreams (1944)
 The Black Robe (1944)
 Somewhere in Berlin (1946)
 Marriage in the Shadows (1947)
 Street Acquaintances (1948)
 Journey to Happiness (1948)
 The Cuckoos (1949)
 The Appeal to Conscience (1949)
 Quartet of Five (1949)
 The Great Mandarin (1949)

Bibliography
 Shandley, Robert R. Rubble Films: German Cinema in the Shadow of the Third Reich. Temple University Press, 2001.

External links

1895 births
1953 deaths
German male film actors
German male silent film actors
People from Freiberg
20th-century German male actors